The 2009–10 season was the 95th season of the Isthmian League, which is an English football competition featuring semi-professional and amateur clubs from London, East and South East England.

Premier Division

The Premier Division consisted of 22 clubs, including 17 clubs from the previous season, and five new clubs:
 Aveley, promoted as champions of Division One North
 Bognor Regis Town, relegated from the Conference South
 Cray Wanderers, promoted as play-off winners in Division One South
 Kingstonian, promoted as champions of Division One South
 Waltham Abbey, promoted as play-off winners in Division One North

Dartford won the division and were promoted to the Conference South along with play-off winners Boreham Wood. Bognor Regis Town were relegated for the second season in a row along with Waltham Abbey, who had only spent one season in the Premier Division. Ashford Town resigned from the league. Margate were reprieved from relegation for the second season in a row, this time after Chester City and Farsley Celtic folded and Grays Athletic were demoted from the Conference Premier to Isthmian League Division One North.

League table

Top scorers

Play-offs

Results grid

Stadia and locations

Division One North

Division One North consisted of 22 clubs, including 17 clubs from the previous season, and five new clubs:
 Harlow Town, relegated from the Premier Division
 Heybridge Swifts, relegated from the Premier Division
 Lowestoft Town, promoted as champions of the Eastern Counties League
 Romford, promoted as champions of the Essex Senior League
 VCD Athletic, promoted as champions of the Kent League

Lowestoft Town won the division and were promoted for the second season in a row along with play-off winners Concord Rangers. Leyton were reprieved from relegation after numerous higher league clubs folded. VCD Athletic were demoted after failing to meet ground grading requirements and returned to the Kent League. Harlow Town were reprieved from relegation after an appeal by VCD was turned down.

After the end of the season Maldon Town merged with 14° Essex Senior League side Tiptree United to form a new club Maldon & Tiptree, who took the place of Maldon Town in 2010–11 IL Division One North.

League table

Top scorers

Play-offs

Results grid

Stadia and locations

Division One South

Division One South consisted of 22 clubs, including 19 clubs from the previous season, and three new clubs:
 Chatham Town, transferred from Division One North
 Horsham YMCA, promoted as Third Place of the Sussex County League
 Ramsgate, relegated from the Premier Division

Folkestone Invicta won the play-offs and returned to the Premier Division after two seasons of absence along with Croydon Athletic, who won the division. Walton Casuals and Eastbourne Town finished in the relegation zone but were reprieved due to the resignation of Ashford Town (Kent) and as a knock-on effect from Merthyr Tydfil's expulsion from the Southern League.

League table

Top scorers

Play-offs

Results grid

Stadia and locations

League Cup

The Isthmian League Cup 2009–10 was the 36th season of the Isthmian League Cup, the league cup competition of the Isthmian League. Sixty-six clubs took part. The competition commenced on 20 October 2009 and finished on 24 March 2010.

Calendar

First round
Four clubs from division Ones participated in the first round, while all other clubs received a bye to the second round.

Second round
The two clubs to have made it through the first round were entered into the draw with every other Isthmian League club, making sixty-four clubs.

Third round

Fourth round

Quarterfinals

Semifinals

Final

See also
Isthmian League
2009–10 Northern Premier League
2009–10 Southern Football League

References

External links
Official website

2009-10
7